Hugo Miguel Arrambide (September 25, 1927 – April 25, 1985) was one of Argentina's top show jumping riders. His best horses were Chimbote, Camalote, Ministerio and Mio-Mio. He won Argentina's National Championship in 1965, 1966, 1972 and 1973, as well as 38 international tournaments, among them the prestigious Aachen Grand Prix in 1965, with Chimbote.

Arrambide represented Argentina at the 1964, 1968 and 1972 Summer Olympics.  He received the 1980 Konex Merit Diploma for horsemanship.

External links
Arrambide and Chimbote
Konex Foundation Entry 

Sportspeople from Buenos Aires
Show jumping riders
1927 births
1985 deaths
Argentine male equestrians
Olympic equestrians of Argentina
Equestrians at the 1964 Summer Olympics
Equestrians at the 1972 Summer Olympics